Julien, ou La vie du poète (Julien, or The Poet's Life) is a poème lyrique, or opera, by composer Gustave Charpentier. The work is devised in a prologue and four acts and uses a French libretto by the composer. Julien is a sequel to Charpentier's Louise (1900) and describes the artistic aspirations of Louise's suitor Julien. The opera premiered in Paris at the Salle Favart on 4 June 1913.

Background and performance history
Like that of Louise, the plot of Julien is semi-autobiographical and requires many characters and chorus roles; in Julien, the female lead portrays four smaller characters in addition to the role of Louise. The opera integrates elements of an earlier composition, La vie du poète, a symphony-drama of 1888–1889. The chorus consists largely of filles du rêve ("girls of the dream"), fairies, and chimeras as well as various men's roles, mainly different kinds of working class men. Charpentier stated that, except in the prologue, "Louise and the various characters who surround Julien are not so much real people as an exteriorized realization of their inner souls".

The opera was not well received at its premiere, although it did gain Gabriel Fauré's admiration for its expressionist qualities. Apart from two productions in 1914, one of which was at the Metropolitan Opera in New York City with Geraldine Farrar and Enrico Caruso in the main roles, it had not been revived until 3 December 2000, when it had its German premiere. That production, at the Theater Dortmund, was directed by John Dew and conducted by Axel Kober.

There are no full-length recordings of the opera. However, Julien's aria "La voix de la nuit", sung by Maurice Dutreix, appears as the final track on the 1935 abridged recording of Louise (re-released in 2003 on Naxos Records).

Roles

Synopsis

Time: 19th century
Place: Initially in Rome; then several others

Prologue

Enthousiasme ("Filled with enthusiasm")

Julien, as a Prix de Rome winner, is studying in Rome at the Villa Medici. This resembles the life of Charpentier as he too was a Prix de Rome winner. However, after this point, the opera moves from the real world into the imagination until the final tableau, set in Montmartre, returns the plot to reality.

Act 1

Au pays du rêve ("In dreamland")

It contains three settings: the Holy Mountain, followed by a setting in the Accursed Valley, and lastly the Temple of Beauty.

Act 2

This takes place in the Slovakian countryside and follows Julien as he experiences doubts in creating his artwork.

Act 3

Impuissance ("Impotence")

This is located in Brittany's wild countryside.

Act 4

Ivresse ("Intoxication")

Set in Montmartre, it closes in the Place Blanche with the sudden appearance of the Temple of Beauty.

References

External links

Complete piano/vocal score, published in 1913 by M. Eschig (on Archive.org)

French-language operas
Operas by Gustave Charpentier
1913 operas
Operas
Operas set in France
Opera world premieres at the Opéra-Comique
Sequels